Delta Chi is an international Greek letter collegiate social fraternity formed on October 13, 1890, at Cornell University, initially as a professional fraternity for law students. On April 30, 1922, Delta Chi became a general membership social fraternity, eliminating the requirement for men to be studying law, and opening membership to all areas of study. Delta Chi became one of the first international fraternities to abolish "hell week", when it did so on April 22, 1929. Delta Chi is a charter member of the North American Interfraternity Conference (NIC). As of Fall 2019, Delta Chi has initiated over 116,000 members at over 110 Chapters and Colonies, with 34 Alumni Chapters. Its headquarters is in Indianapolis, Indiana.

History of Delta Chi

Founding

According to Frederick Moore Whitney, there were two or three groups working on the idea of a new law fraternity during the spring of 1889. After the class election, there were meetings held in Myron Mckee Crandall's apartment as well as in Monroe Marsh Sweetland's law office. It is not clear how these two groups came together, though there seem to have been some individuals who had attended both groups.

Over the summer of 1890, many of the details of the organization were worked out by Myron Mckee Crandall, who had stayed in Ithaca until after school opened. In regard to the adoption of the constitution, Albert Sullard Barnes wrote the following in his 1907 Quarterly article:

"As I recall it, after refreshing my recollection from the original minutes now in my possession, on the evening of October 13, 1890, six students in the Law School, Brothers John M. Gorham, Thomas J. Sullivan, F.K. Stephens, A.D. Stillman and the writer, together with Myron Crandall and O.L. Potter, graduate students, and Monroe Sweetland, a former Student in the Law School, met in a brother's room and adopted the constitution and by-laws, and organized the Delta Chi Fraternity."

The minutes from that meeting state, "Charter granted to Cornell Chapter," indicating from the beginning the intent to start a national fraternity.

Delta Chi goes single membership

In 1909 in Ithaca, New York, the 15th Convention of Delta Chi adopted an amendment to the Constitution prohibiting dual-membership (i.e. initiating members of other fraternities, and prohibiting Delta Chi members from joining other fraternities). As a professional law fraternity, Delta Chi had originally allowed members from other general fraternities to join. The change in policy led to the loss of chapters in New York Law, West Virginia, Northwestern and Washington University in St. Louis.

Delta Chi becomes a general fraternity

During World War I, a majority of the members of the active chapters dropped their college courses and enlisted in the armed forces. Chapter houses became almost deserted, and a convention in August 1917 was skipped. At the end of the war, members returned to the universities to complete their courses. The chapter finances were generally in bad condition as were the houses. Attempting to rebuild, many chapters stretched the recruiting restrictions by initiating men who had no intention of studying law.

Starting in 1919 in Minneapolis at the 20th Convention, the issue of becoming a general fraternity was debated. In 1921 in Columbus, Ohio at the 21st Convention, two amendments were proposed, for and against general membership respectively. For three days votes were held, until (on a swing vote by the Buffalo Alumni Chapter representative), the Wadsworth amendment was adopted. Ratified in 1922, the amendment made Delta Chi a general fraternity, no longer requiring its members to be law students at their respective universities and colleges.

Founding fathers

Albert Sullard Barnes
Myron McKee Crandall
John Milton Gorham, (First "BB")
Peter Schermerhorn Johnson
Edward Richard O'Malley
Owen Lincoln Potter, (First "AA")
Alphonse Derwin Stillman
Thomas Allen Joseph Sullivan
Monroe Marsh Sweetland
Thomas David Watkins
Frederick Moore Whitney

Philanthropy
In 2006, the fraternity named the V Foundation as its official philanthropic organization. Since then, Delta Chi has raised over one million dollars for the V foundation.

Organization of the fraternity

Undergraduate officer positions
Delta Chi chapters and colonies have six permanent officer positions. While each position has strict definitions of responsibility, their duties may vary slightly from group to group.
A – The "A" is the president of the chapter or colony. He serves as presiding officer at chapter meetings and chapter events.
B – The "B" is the vice president of the chapter or colony. He schedules and chairs executive committee meetings, and oversees all committees.
C – The "C" is the secretary of the chapter or colony. He keeps record of chapter or colony meetings, and is responsible for completing necessary paperwork and online forms.
D – The "D" is the treasurer of the chapter or colony. He is responsible for tracking chapter financial records and files, as well as collecting dues and creating a budget.
E – The "E" is the historian of the chapter or colony. He is responsible for contacting and communicating with alumni. He also works on chapter or colony newsletters and other publications.
F – The "F" is the Sergeant at Arms. The "F" works on developing and implementing safety precautions for chapter or colony events.

Committee positions
Each chapter and colony is encouraged to have a functioning committee system. Each committee chairman has duties designated by Delta Chi. Committees include subjects such as recruitment, educating new recruits, philanthropy, scholarship, social events, housing, and others.

Support alumni positions
BB – The role of the "BB" is to mentor, advise and service as a liaison between student members and alumni. This position is required by Delta Chi Law to be a two-year term and served by a Delta Chi alumnus.
Alumni Board of Trustees – The purpose of The Alumni Board of Trustees (ABT) is to lead, supervise and advise the chapter. Members may include alumni, chapter officers, parents, grandparents, faculty, and local business & community leaders. Members may be aligned to advise and mentor chapter undergraduate officers and the chapter's committees.
Housing Corporation – The role of the Housing Corporation is to manage the chapter or colony housing facilities and all legal responsibilities of such management. Since a Housing Corporation is a separate, incorporated legal entity, it has no requirements set forth by Delta Chi Law.

The Delta Chi Quarterly is distributed to members and alumni.

Chapters, colonies, and alumni chapters

For a listing of all Delta Chi chapters, colonies, and alumni chapters see List of Delta Chi chapters.

Delta Chi chapters are unique in naming. Most college fraternities and sororities are named in an alphabetical Greek system. This is not so with Delta Chi chapters and colonies, who are named by institution, and sometimes by self-naming. Therefore, the first 'Alpha' chapter was the Cornell Chapter.

Prominent Delta Chis

Local chapter misconduct

Death of Adam Oakes
In February 2021, Virginia Commonwealth University's chapter was suspended after freshman Adam Oakes died of alcohol poisoning after an off-campus fraternity party. The VCU chapter was later expelled from the university three months after Oakes's death, after the university found that the chapter had violated several university policies, including those on hazing and alcohol.

See also
List of social fraternities and sororities

External links
The Delta Chi Fraternity
The Delta Chi Educational Foundation
The V Foundation

Sources and references

 
Student organizations established in 1890
North American Interfraternity Conference
International student societies
Student societies in the United States
Cornell University student organizations
Iowa City, Iowa
1890 establishments in New Jersey
Fraternities and sororities based in Indianapolis